The World Archery Philippines, Inc. is the national governing body for archery in the Philippines. It is used to be known as the Philippines and Philippine Archers' National Network and Alliance (PANNA). It is accredited by the World Archery Federation which is the governing body for the sport of archery in the world. 

Its former president was Federico Moreno, the only son of the late German Moreno and the father of 2014 Youth Olympic Games gold-medalist Luis Gabriel Moreno.

References

External links
Philippine Archers' National Network and Alliance profile at the Philippine Olympic Committee website

Philippines
Archery in the Philippines
Archery